Eikhoishibu Kanano (English: Who Are We)  is a 2020 Indian Meitei language film directed by Ajit Yumnam and produced by Brojen Yumnam. It is a movie on Indo-Myanmar border dispute. The film was premiered at the Jaipur International Film Festival 2020. It was also selected for the 8th Delhi International Film Festival 2020 and the India International Film Festival 2020, Pune. Eikhoishibu Kanano won the Best Film at 10th Dada Shaheb Phalke Film Award 2020 and also Best Film - Debut and two other awards at 13th Manipur State Film Awards 2020. It also won nine awards, including Best Film and Best Director at the 9th MANIFA 2020. It got official selection at the 8th Indian Cine Film Festival, 2020.

The film was certified in 2019 but the Manipur premiere of the movie was held at the Manipur State Film Development Society (MSFDS), Imphal on 21 March 2021.

Synopsis
The movie is set in Indo-Myanmar border, a zone of constant conflict mainly on the territorial boundary question. The people of Manipur living there faced varied forms of torture and oppression from the Myanma army junta but their sense of fraternity with the rest of people of India never faded away from their minds. Even a youth from the village who was recruited to the Indian army, laid down his life fighting the terrorists in the north western border of India. But it always failed to capture the attention of the central government and national media like it was done in Kashmir. Seeing the contrast and out of dilemma, the villagers of the Indo-Myanmar border finally asked: Who Are We?

Cast
 Irom Mangi as Lukhoi
 Sangeeta as Ningoleima
 Joyson Khapai as Ashang
 Nandakumar Nongmaithem as Sanathoi, Home Minister's son, Journalist
 Geetchandra Chongtham as Home Minister
 Sarangthem Monika as Inunganbi
 Biren as Thanil
 Ashokumar Chongtham as Police
 Achui
 Bidyaraj
 Sarto Mary
 Thouba
 Khekhe

Accolades
Eikhoishibu Kanano won nine awards out of 13 nominations at the 9th MANIFA 2020 organised by Sahitya Seva Samiti, Kakching. It won the Best Film Award at the 10th Dada Saheb Phalke Film Award 2020. It also won the Best Film - Debut, Best Lyrics (Tamna Uriba Loibi Chingsang song) and Special Jury Cinematography awards at the 13th Manipur State Film Awards 2020. Eikhoishibu Kanano was also nominated for best film, best director, best actor & best actress in Prag Cine Awards - North East 2021.

Soundtrack
Gopi (KOG) composed the soundtrack for the film and Ajit Yumnam wrote the lyrics. The song is titled Tamna Uriba Loibi Chingshang.

References

Meitei-language films
2020 films